Lawrence Alufea Sampofu (born 1955) is a Namibian soldier and politician. He is the governor of Zambezi Region since 2010.

Sampofu was born on 10 August 1955 in Mbabanzi in the Zambezi Region. During Namibia's struggle for independence he joined the People's Liberation Army of Namibia (PLAN), the military wing of SWAPO. He received training in Zambia and Tanzania and was involved in several PLAN battles. After independence he was Head of Military Operations of the Zambezi Region and later Senior Operations Officer. During his military career, Sampofu rose to the rank of colonel in the Namibian Defence Force. He also served on the MINURCAT and UNMEE United Nations peace keeping missions in Central Africa.

References

1955 births
Living people
SWAPO politicians
People from Zambezi Region
People's Liberation Army of Namibia personnel
Namibian military personnel